Pål Anders Jörgen Hollender (born 20 July 1968 in Lidköping, Sweden) is a Swedish film director and performance artist.

Hollender is known foremost for his controversial documentaries. Pelle polis (Pelle the Policeman) (1998) that dealt with issues of power and pederasty (with autobiographical remarks) was denied airing on TVs. His 2001 documentary Buy Bye Beauty about the Swedish interference in Latvian sex industry, which included himself engaging in sexual intercourse with several prostitutes in Riga, was condemned by Latvian authorities for its contents and allegations about the proliferation of the country's sex industry following its independence.

Hollender became known through his participation in the 1998 edition of the reality show Expedition Robinson on SVT, he also participated in the 2003 edition. He has also been in television shows like Kanal 5's comedy series Grattis Världen! that featured Filip & Fredrik.

Hollender is in a relationship with radio presenter Jessika Gedin. The couple has a daughter together who was born in 2004.

External links
Official website

1968 births
Swedish film directors
Swedish artists
Living people
University of Gothenburg alumni